Wayside crosses are monumental constructions in the form of a cross in the city of Rostov-on-Don, Russia.

History and description 
The tradition of erecting wayside crosses began in Russia a very long time. They were installed mostly at road intersections or entrance to a city or village. Looking at such a cross, people prayed to God before starting their road. It was believed that the cross provides protection from demons and enemies.

Wayside crosses were also installed in honor of church holidays or most revered saints.

Wayside and commemorative crosses were erected in various parts of Rostov-on-Don.

At the entrance to the Northern Cemetery on Orbital Street a wayside cross was installed in 2005.

In 2001, near the Church of Mid-Pentecost in Zheleznodorozhny District of Rostov-on-Don, a memorial cross was erected in honor of Cossacks who died in many wars fighting for Russia.

In 1994, The International Fund of Slavic Literature and Culture held an event to install the wayside crosses in the name of the Holy Equal-to-the-Apostles Methodius and Cyril, who invented the Slavonic alphabet, in thirty-one cities, including Rostov-on-Don. In May 1994, in honor of St. Cyril and Methodius, the teachers of the Slavs, was installed and consecrated a venerable memorable four-pointed stone cross. It is installed on a pedestal at the city park next to the Don State Public Library at the intersection of Pushkinskaya Street and the University Lane in Rostov-on-Don. The author of the monument is the Moscow sculptor Vyacheslav Klykov. Every year on May 24, Eastern Orthodox Church and the entire Slavic world honor the memory of the Holy Equal-to-the-Apostles Cyril and Methodius, the creators of the Slavonic script.

A white wayside cross was also erected at Gremuchiy spring. In the 1990s, the spring was consecrated.

Literature 
 Малаховский Е. И. Храмы и культовые сооружения Ростова-на-Дону, утраченные и существующие. — Ростов-на-Дону: NB, 2006. — 240 с., ил. —  (in Russian).

References

External links 
(in Russian)
 Rostov-on-Don. The Church of Mid-Pentecost
 A wayside cross dedicated to Sts. Cyril and Methodius
 A wayside cross dedicated to Sts. Cyril and Methodius, Rostov-on-Don
 Rostov-on-Don springs: Gremuchiy spring

Tourist attractions in Rostov-on-Don
Wayside crosses
Monuments and memorials in Rostov-on-Don